Richard Eastis Reynolds was an American musician, songwriter, and trombonist who was an arranger for the Four Freshmen. He also arranged for Frank Sinatra and authored "If I Ever Love Again", which Sinatra recorded in 1949. Brian Wilson of the Beach Boys said of Reynolds: "[He's] just about a god to me. His work is the greatest, and the Freshmen's execution is too much." Reynolds was later employed by Wilson for the recording of The Beach Boys' Christmas Album (1964) and Adult/Child (unreleased, 1977).

As songwriter
"Silver Threads and Golden Needles", 1956 single written with Jack Rhodes 
"Sweet Talk", single for Boots Randolph, written with Gene Fiocca

References

External links

1923 births
1988 deaths
20th-century American composers
American bandleaders
American music arrangers
American trombonists
Male trombonists
20th-century American male musicians